Abaredda is a town in western Eritrea. It is located in Mogolo subregion in the Gash-Barka region.

Nearby towns and villages include Mogolo, Hambok, Bisha, Algheden and Attai.

References

External links
Abaredda: Eritrea

Populated places in Eritrea